A Miracle of Science is a science fiction webcomic written by Jon Kilgannon, with art by Mark Sachs. The story follows the exploits of Benjamin Prester and his partner Caprice Quevillion as they move from world to world in pursuit of Dr. Virgil Haas, a man who suffers from Science Related Memetic Disorder, basically a mad scientist. It is set in the year 2148 and there have been significant technological advances, such as the terraforming and subsequent colonization of multiple planets and moons in the Solar System.

The comic has been in color since the end of Chapter 1.

The comic ended on February 12, 2007, after 436 pages.

Characters
Full character bios. The main characters are
 Benjamin Prester (American, from what is now Canada), one of the Vorstellen Police's best agents. 
 Caprice Quevillion (Martian), a captain and criminal psychologist with the Martian police. Mars requested that she be assigned to Prester's current case. 
 Dr. Virgil Haas (unknown), the mad scientist Benjamin and Caprice are currently investigating. He names his robots after poets. 
 Mars, the collective consciousness of the Martian people.

Supporting characters:
 Chaucer, a small spherical robot of Haas' and his second-in-command 
 Mukhali (Mannie) Delger (Mongolian), "the best computer programmer born in the 22nd century," according to Agent Prester, and a former mad scientist 
 Rocco Dinh Diem (Venusian), a figure in the Venusian mafia 
 Dryden, a large robot of Haas', who manages Haas' network of unicycle camera drones, called "Marlowes" 
 Dr. Beatriz Juruna, industrial chemist, a near-mad-scientist friend of Haas, living on the Moon. 
 Fabula, a robotic member of the Martian constabulary, partner of Syuzhet. 
 Gustave Nyerere (Republic of Southern Africa, from what is now Tanzania), Benjamin's superior. 
 Pindar One and Two, two very large robots of Haas' 
 Serafina Quevillion, Caprice's aunt 
 Thaddeus Quevillion, Caprice's father 
 Wei Quevillion, Caprice's 7-year-old sister 
 Xia Quevillion, Caprice's mother, a sculptor 
 Qin Shiuhuangdi, Caprice's artificially intelligent police cruiser (first appearance, reconstructed appearance); it can travel six times faster than non-Martian ships.
 Djaya Sumatera, a former mad scientist and expert on artificial intelligence
 Syuzhet, a robotic member of the Martian constabulary, partner of Fabula. 
 Greta Vedrine (Venusian), an associate of - and semi-bodyguard for - Rocco 
 Taro Watanuki, an information broker .
 Mrs. Waters, President of Mars

Mars and Martians
Martians are humans from the planet Mars. "Mars" refers to both the planet and the group mind of all living Martians. Martians are still individuals, though individuals can have the group mind act through them (whereupon their eyes turn black) to communicate messages. Martians tend to be informal, preferring to use first names in conversation.

Mars was settled by American and Chinese missions, which eventually developed into science and artisan communities (determined by matrilineality). Communication within a community is easy, but between them requires face-to-face interaction.

Martian technology is very advanced in comparison to the rest of humanity:
 Mars began the Terraforming of Venus, Ganymede, and Titan, for the benefit of the rest of humanity.
 They developed the FTL communications network used by everyone in the Solar System.
 Thaddeus Quevillion expects to be able to restart Martian plate tectonics to make the atmosphere self-sustaining.
 The vectored air shield allows a Martian to levitate, exist in vacuum, and deflect projectiles. It can be extended to cover nearby people.
 Nanotechnology allows many things, including forming furniture out of the floor, repairing broken bones in seconds, and reconstituting existing objects into usable materials.
 Autofactories allow manufacture of just about anything the factory can be programmed for.

After starting the terraforming of other worlds in the Solar System, the Martians isolated themselves from the rest of humanity for a century, recontacting the rest of humanity just a decade before the story.

Quotations
 "It must be nice to be omnipotent." "Not omnipotent, merely extremely powerful." -- Benjamin/Mars 
 "I saw nothing that wasn't out in the open." "It's only out in the open if you have networking built into your head and a planetary brain backing you up." -- Caprice/Benjamin 
 "Is this a common thing for Martians, re-entering [the atmosphere] without a spacecraft?" "Actually, it's never been done before." -- Benjamin/Caprice 
 "Ah Mars. I wondered when you'd be showing up." "We are always here. We just usually choose to be silent." "Great. I'm sure I'll be hearing that in my nightmares for years to come." Benjamin/Mars (via Caprice)/Benjamin 
 "I've been on Mars for five minutes and already my brain hurts." -- Benjamin 
 "Hundreds of billions of stars. All empty of intelligent life. An infinity of darkness, containing us...and you." -- Caprice speaking to Benjamin 
 "We keep telling the boys in science that stellifying Jupiter would just be gauche." -- a Martian 
 "Mars likes you." "That's like saying "Brazil has decided you're cute."" -- Caprice/Benjamin 
 "Does it hurt, not being able to hear other people's thoughts?" "I didn't used to think so." -- Martian boy/Benjamin 
 "I'm Martian. We always remember." -- Caprice 
 "The Solar Parliament requires that Mars have a government, so we cobbled one together." -- Caprice 
 "The Venusians probably shouldn't have used Martian equipment to build their Martian detectors." -- Caprice 
 "Any device complex enough to detect Martians is going to eventually become self-aware." -- Caprice 
 "Mars exists because of us." -- Caprice, while being "unwise"

Mad Science
In the MoS universe, mad scientists suffer from SRMD, Science Related Memetic Disorder. There are medications that can keep it under control, but they can also interfere with normal thinking processes; as Manny Delger explains, he has begun to skip his medication every other day because "I feel like my head is full of felt".
The disorder goes through the phases of infection, obsession, challenge, chase scene, and denouement, then resets and repeats if not treated.
 Infection. An idea for world domination occurs to the scientist.
 Obsession. The scientist works obsessively towards his or her goal.
 Challenge. The forces of law and order (usually the Vorstellen Police) confront the scientist.
 Chase scene. Self-explanatory.
 Denouement. The scientist surrenders, sometimes after a brief fight and/or negotiation.

Tracking down and arresting mad scientists is the primary function of the Vorstellen Police. "Vorstellen" is from a German verb that can mean "to imagine" -- and thus these police are the guardians of the imagination.
 "When you're a recovering mad scientist, you're always afraid you'll lose control and wake up some morning with a half-built time machine and a plan to go back in time and pants Hitler..." -- Djaya Sumatera 
 "Find Prester! Find Quevillion! Do it, or I'll disassemble you and build robots who can do it!" -- Haas 
 "Then we're walking into the office of a mad scientist who's been operating undisturbed for over a year. Which makes him very dangerous ..." -- Benjamin 
 "I'm not mad. I'm just misunderstood." -- Haas 
 "What doth it profit a man if he gain the whole world and suffer the loss of his own soul?" "Well, he'd profit by one entire world, for starters." -- Juruna/Haas 
 "I'm not mad. I just have a singular vision for the future." -- Haas 
 "Apparently discussing your plan is part of the disease." -- Rocco 
 "Change is never good in a mad scientist." -- Chaucer

Other quotes
 "And tell intelligence they forgot to mention the radioactive spiders." -- Benjamin 
 "I thought I could help." "Could you help without so much property damage?" -- Caprice/Benjamin 
 "I suggest pondering faster." -- Benjamin 
 "That noise, gentlemen... is the sound of conquest!" -- Benjamin  
 "Behold... the Martian invasion fleet!" -- Caprice/Benjamin

Plot summary

Prologue
start-end. Haas is infected with SRMD. Nyerere, at Mars' request, assigns Benjamin Prester (his best agent) a partner, Caprice Quevillion.

Reflecting the Dark
start-end. Benjamin meets Caprice at Feynman Station, observed by Dryden's network of Marlowes. They board Caprice's ship, Qin Shihuangdi, and head for the Moon, where Djaya Sumatera tells them of rumors that an anonymous poster on a Ganymede server has been talking about revolutionary AI, which could be the product of mad science. Warned and aided by the Mars group mind (acting through Caprice), Benjamin and Caprice escape an attack by Haas' robots.

The Waters Above the Heavens
start-end.
Mars analyses the remains of the robots, which use technology from many places, especially some Ganymedan software; Benjamin consequently decides to head to Ganymede. A call to information broker Taro Watanuki on Von Hayek Station (a space colony at Earth's L4 point) reveals that the robot's software was probably written by Benjamin's old friend Manny Delger. After a six-day trip to Ganymede, Benjamin and Caprice track Manny down, discovering that he has been skipping his SRMD medications. Manny admits to writing the software to network the Marlowes, which would allow them to form a group mind similar to the Martians. They visit the anonymous server on Io through which Manny's client communicated; Caprice "accidentally" hacks into their network, discovering that Manny's communications were relayed through another server on Earth.

Haas and his robots track Benjamin and Caprice to Io, then towards Mars for a gravity boost to either Earth or Venus. They obtain ship access codes from Beatriz Juruna and use them to take over (via a software perversion attack) several ships on similar routes to Qin's, then use the weapons of the Solar Navy destroyer Gorbachev to destroy Qin's shipbody. Caprice saves Qin's cogence core, escapes with Benjamin, and re-enters the Martian atmosphere using only the technology she is wearing (primarily the vector field and gravity blades).

A Saint Abroad and a Devil at Home
start-end. Benjamin and Caprice impact safely on Mars, where they are rescued by Fabula and Syuzhet and taken to Alnaschar City. Benjamin meets Caprice's family, who help him replace the equipment lost in the demise of Qin's original shipbody (including a new railgun etched with a unicorn and rainbow by Wei). In the person of Mrs. Waters, the "President of Mars," Mars reveals it knows Benjamin was once a mad scientist.

Haas makes contact with Rocco to obtain equipment that he can't create with an autofactory he stole, then later takes over the whole mob by eliminating the capos above Rocco. He reveals his Master Plan; he is going to sell robots to all the governments of the Solar System; robots built at cut-rate prices made possible by his use of a stolen Martian autofactory; robots with overrides that will put them firmly under his command at an unspecified future date.

The Fire that Severs Day from Night
start-end.
While everything else is going on, Benjamin flashes back to his days as a mad scientist in 2141, building robots with Manny and Djaya to take over the world.

He and Caprice board the new (and much improved) Qin and use the faster-than-light breaker gate to reach Earth quickly. They discover that the anonymous server has been destroyed in a viral attack, but Caprice reconstructs a broken molecular memory card to retrieve the information they need. She analyzes the data and discovers a call to a restaurant in Gagarin City on the Moon where there had been a conversation between Haas in holographic telepresence and Juruna in person. Benjamin and Caprice visit the restaurant and pressure the maitre d' to copy the corresponding security camera information, from which Mars identifies Juruna. They serve a search warrant on Juruna's home and pressure her into identifying Haas (and Rocco) by threatening to "take him down the hard way."

From sightings of Qin by Dryden's network of Marlowes, Haas realizes the Martians have FTL travel and not just FTL communication.

Rocco decides to attempt to gain some leverage to use against Haas. Greta discovers that Benjamin is after Haas. Henri discovers Haas' background was faked and identifies Oswald as someone who knows where to find him. Greta pressures Oswald to identify Haas' island base.

Benjamin and Caprice travel to Venus, where the inhabitants hate and fear Martians. Caprice pretends to be from Earth, and asks Venusian Immigration's Martian detector (Sally the AI) to let her pass into Astarte City without warning. They track Rocco to Cafe Sabella, where Benjamin, though wounded, overcomes Rocco and Greta and gets Rocco to reveal Haas' location. Dryden captures Caprice by breaking her connection with Mars, rendering her catatonic and convincing Mars she is dead.

Benjamin convinces Nyerere to let him continue the case despite his injury, his (apparent) loss of Caprice, and his extreme emotional stress (all of which can bring about an SRMD relapse). Caprice recovers enough to talk to Dryden. Benjamin heads for Haas' base, constructing an electricity gun ("It's a ball lightning gun.") as he goes.

Caprice convinces Dryden to let her out; Haas sends his robot army, including a particularly large robot named Pindar, to the city to mop up Rocco's mob and make a convincing (if perhaps premature) show of strength. Pindar himself captures Rocco and Greta by disabling the police paddy wagon carting them off to jail.

Caprice talks Dryden into sending a Morse code signal via one of his observer drones (the Marlowes) to Sally, the Martian AI implanted in a customs security machine at the spaceport; Sally relays the news to Mars, and flies off (converting her housing into a flying weapon) in search of Caprice's exact location.

Meanwhile, Benjamin has infiltrated Haas' base and coerced Chaucer into leading him to Haas; Chaucer attempts to trap him with another Pindar robot, but the battle between Pindar-2 and Benjamin ends in a stalemate and the two wind up talking it out. Benjamin convinces Pindar-2 and Chaucer - by treating the sentient AIs as his equals - that he wants their boss to be taken alive and unharmed, and that treatment will actually be beneficial to Haas.

Sally intercepts Haas' fleet of robots en route back to their base and engages in a pitched battle with them. Pindar-1 attempts to use the same nanotech/consciousness-disrupting weapon that was deployed by Dryden to capture Caprice, but Sally manages to avoid the weapon's field of effect and retaliates by trapping the entire fleet at the bottom of a massive void in the ocean.

Finally, Benjamin and Caprice confront Haas, and manage to bring him to reason thanks to Benjamin's intimate knowledge of SRMD and how to handle it. Caprice uses her nanotech and psychology to keep Haas' robots from interfering, and all ends well.

Epilogue
start-end
Benjamin and Caprice start a new life.

Minor plot points
Martian technology:
 The personal vectored air shield can protect human individuals from a 300 km/h impact. The ship-sized version can survive a single hit from a 1500 megaton fleet-killer missile.
 The technology involved in the Martian group mind can let them monitor nearby computer networks, and even hack into them "accidentally".
 The ship-killer cadence lance is considered light armament for a Martian vessel
 Gravity blades can slow something from re-entry speed to rest by the time it reaches the ground.
 Mars has kept secret the fact that they have FTL travel and what they found when they started looking for alien civilizations.

Benjamin himself was once a mad scientist; he was the first SRMD sufferer to form a stable team with other mad scientists (in 2141 with Djaya Sumatera and Mukhali "Manny" Delger). He needs no medication to remain stable, unless he receives a major psychological disturbance.

Haas' network of camera drones forms a sort of group mind, similar to that of the Martians. Non-networked computers apparently only think about socks.

References

External links
 Miracle of Science
 MoS Glossary
 Recaps of Chapter 1 and Chapter 2
 A Miracle of Science on TV Tropes

2000s webcomics
Science fiction webcomics
Holography in fiction
Telepresence in fiction
Robot comics
Fiction about the Solar System
Fiction set on Mars
Nanotechnology in fiction
Mental health in fiction
2002 webcomic debuts